Exile Express is a 1939 American drama film directed by Otis Garrett and starring Anna Sten, Alan Marshal and Jerome Cowan.

Plot
After being wrongly implicated in the murder of her scientist boss by foreign agents, a young immigrant woman is placed on board an "exile express" from California to New York City where she is to be deported after her arrival at Ellis Island. With the help of a journalist who has fallen in love with her, she jumps the train and sets out to prove her innocence.

Cast 
Anna Sten as Nadine Nikolas
Alan Marshal as Steve Reynolds
Jerome Cowan as Paul Brandt
Walter Catlett as Gus
Jed Prouty as Hanley
Stanley Fields as Tony Kassan
Leonid Kinskey as David
Etienne Girardot as Caretaker
Irving Pichel as Victor
Harry Davenport as Dr. Hite
Addison Richards as Purnell
Feodor Chaliapin Jr. as Kaishevshy
Spencer Charters as Justice of the Peace Henry P. Smith
Byron Foulger as Serge
Don Brodie as Mullins
Henry Roquemore as Constable
Vince Barnett as Deputy Constable
Maude Eburne as Mrs. Smith

Production
It was the first film Sten had made in the United States since leaving her contract with Samuel Goldwyn after The Wedding Night (1935). Since then Sten had appeared in a single film A Woman Alone (1936) in Britain. Exile Express was made by the small Grand National Pictures, which went out of business the same year after producing several large-budgeted films which didn't recoup their costs.

External links 

1939 films
1939 drama films
American drama films
American black-and-white films
Grand National Films films
Rail transport films
Films directed by Otis Garrett
1930s English-language films
1930s American films